Alexander "Greek" Athas (6 October 1922 – 29 April 2009) was an American basketball player and sports celebrity. He is a member of the Louisiana, Greater New Orleans, Tulane, American Hellenic Educational Progressive Association (AHEPA) and Warren Easton Halls of Fame.

Basketball career 
Athas attended Warren Easton Senior High School in New Orleans, Louisiana, graduating in 1942. He was a letterman in football, basketball and track, and is a member of the Warren Easton Hall of Fame.

"Greek" Athas attended Tulane University during the time period 1943–48. In the 1943–44 basketball season, he led the SEC conference in scoring (14.1 points per game) and set a single-game tournament scoring record (28). Athas also played football and track while at Tulane. He was the SEC Champion in the 220-yard low hurdles and in the broad jump. He once won five events in a single track meet against LSU. His college career was interrupted by a stint in the U.S. Navy (1944–45) where he participated in the battle of Okinawa before returning to Tulane. He was a three-time All-SEC basketball selection at Tulane and is a member of the Tulane Athletic Hall of Fame.

Following his college career, Athas played professional basketball in the ABL for three years. He played for the Wilkes-Barre Barons (1949–50), the Utica Pros (1950–51), and the Elmira, New York Colonels (1951–52).

Coaching and Teaching Career 
Athas returned to his prep alma mater and coached basketball, track and football for 34 years at Warren Easton Senior High School in New Orleans, Louisiana. He retired in 1988.

See also 
 Louisiana Sports Hall of Fame
 Wilkes-Barre Barons
 Utica Pros
 Elmira Colonels

References

External links 
 Greater New Orleans Sports Hall of Fame
 Obituary
 Louisiana Sports Hall of Fame
 Association for Professional Basketball Research
 New Orleans Times-Picayune article

1922 births
2009 deaths
Basketball players from New Orleans
High school basketball coaches in Louisiana
Tulane Green Wave men's basketball players
Utica Pros players
American people of Greek descent
American men's basketball players
United States Navy personnel of World War II